The Crédit Lyonnais ("Lyon Credit [Company]") was a major French bank, created in 1863 and absorbed by former rival Crédit Agricole in 2003. Its head office was initially in Lyon but moved to Paris in 1882. In the early years of the 20th century, it was the world's largest bank by total assets.

Its former French retail network survives as LCL S.A., a fully owned subsidiary of Crédit Agricole, under the brand LCL adopted in 2005 with reference to "Le Crédit Lyonnais".

History

19th Century

The creation of Crédit Lyonnais was favored by French legislation of  that liberalized the creation of joint-stock companies without prior government authorization. Prominent promoters of Saint-Simonianism initially participated in the venture, namely François Barthélemy Arlès-Dufour who was instrumental in convincing Germain to initiate the project, Paulin Talabot, and Barthélemy Enfantin, as well as industrialists such as Eugène Schneider. Crédit Lyonnais then started its operations on July 26, initially in the recently opened Palais du Commerce of Lyon.

The bank initially served local businesses in Lyon, but opened branches in Paris and Marseille as early as 1865. Furthermore, Germain married into a Parisian family and entered national politics in 1869. During the Franco-Prussian War in 1870, he moved some of the bank’s funds to London for safety and thus created Crédit Lyonnais’s first foreign branch there. He also participated in the negotiation of the financial clauses of the Treaty of Frankfurt that ended the war in 1871.

From 1876, Germain directed the building of an ostentatious headquarters building in Paris, with architectural details modeled on the Louvre Palace. The first phase of that Parisian Crédit Lyonnais headquarters was completed in 1883, but it kept expanding until occupying the entire city block in 1913 after Germain’s death. In 1882, the bank’s head office was formally transferred from Lyon to the new building, even though it remained legally registered in Lyon. Beyond the prestige head office, in the late 1870s the Crédit Lyonnais aggressively developed its network of Parisian locations, opening 23 in 1879 alone.

After London in 1870, Crédit Lyonnais soon embarked in an ambitious drive of international expansion, opening branches in Alexandria (1874), Constantinople and Cairo (1875), Geneva, Madrid and Port Said (1876), Vienna (1877), Saint Petersburg (1878, initially under an individual name due to restrictive regulations that were lifted the next year), New York City (1879, but closed in 1882 after facing punitive taxation), Barcelona, Brussels, and Smyrna (1888), Moscow (1891), Jerusalem and Odesa (1892), Lisbon (1893), Bombay and Calcutta (1895, closed the next year), Porto and Valencia (1897), Seville and San Sebastián (1900). In Asia, other than its two short-lived Indian branches in 1895-1896, Crédit Lyonnais participated in collective endeavors through its shareholding in the Banque de l'Indochine from 1896 and later participation in the China Consortium. Overall, Crédit Lyonnais became a major player in the placement of foreign government bonds, not least of the Russian Empire, thus participating in directing the large savings of French households to destinations abroad, which resulted in the then widespread perception of France as the “banker of the world”.

20th Century

In 1900, Crédit Lyonnais overtook Lloyds Bank and Deutsche Bank to become the world’s largest bank by total assets, a position it retained until overtaken by Société Générale in 1920.

Crédit Lyonnais’s franchise was negatively impacted by Russia’s repeal of its debt obligations following the October Revolution of 1917, and was otherwise disrupted by World War I. In the spring of 1918, it evacuated some of its funds and records from Paris to protect them from a possible German advance. In the postwar years, it faced social unrest with a major employee strike in mid-1925. In the interwar period, it exited from Smyrna and Jerusalem in 1927, and from Istanbul in 1933.

Crédit Lyonnais was nationalized on  together with the three other major French depository banks, namely Banque Nationale pour le Commerce et l’Industrie, Comptoir National d’Escompte de Paris, and Société Générale. It kept expanding abroad in the new context of decolonization. By 1974, it had 1,905 branches and 47,000 employees. It re-established a presence in Moscow in 1972, the first Western bank to do so.

In 1987, the bank strengthened its investment banking operation under the semi-autonomous brand Clinvest. Then under , appointed chairman in 1988, the bank embarked on a highly aggressive expansion strategy both domestically and internationally, including by providing favorable terms of financing to politically connected projects, companies and entrepreneurs. In 1989 it created Crédit Lyonnais Europe, a wholly owned subsidiary that was intended to embody its leading position in what was expected to be a forthcoming European banking market consolidation. In 1992, it acquired  in Germany as part of a European development strategy that also entailed the purchase of smaller banks in Italy and Spain. Bad loans started mounting in 1992, however, and the bank had to disclose a large loss for its calendar year 1993.

In the course of that expansion, Crédit Lyonnais became the leading lender to Hollywood studios in the late 1980s. Clients included independent film studios Castle Rock Entertainment, Weintraub Entertainment Group, Nelson Entertainment, Vestron Pictures, and Carolco Pictures. Many of these companies developed financial difficulties. It also financed Giancarlo Parretti's takeover of Metro-Goldwyn-Mayer in 1990 for $1.25 billion. However, Paretti started looting the company, fired most of the accounting staff, appointed his 21-year-old daughter to a senior financial post, and used company money to buy presents for several girlfriends. By June 1991, CL had had enough: under the terms of an April agreement that gave it control of Parreti's MGM stock, it fired Parretti and began a lawsuit against him. However, CL soon faced intense scrutiny for its dealings with Parretti. Overall, CL lost $5 billion from its Hollywood deals.

The bank underwent harsh restructuring under new chairman Jean Peyrelevade, appointed in November 1993, and general manager Pascal Lamy, appointed a year later, and was recapitalized by the French government. Among other transactions, the CDR notably agreed to pay US$525 million to the California Department of Insurance in order to head off a lawsuit over the Executive Life insurance scandal. The CDR also ended up with the various film libraries from now defunct film production companies that defaulted on their loans. The library was known as the Epic film library. The Loeb & Loeb law firm spent 4 years determining the full extent of the film assets. In late 1997, PolyGram Filmed Entertainment out bid Disney, Metro-Goldwyn-Mayer, Live Entertainment and several other companies, for the Epic library at $225 million. Despite losing the bid, MGM would acquire the Epic library and the rest of PolyGram's pre-1996 library in 1999. To allow the bailout, the European Commission imposed severe limitations, principally on the bank's international activities, and the bank was forced to sell many entities in the following years. In total, it cost French taxpayers nearly €15 billion.

The bank returned to profit in 1997. In 1999, Crédit Lyonnais’s shares were successfully floated on the Paris Bourse, thus partly reversing the nationalization of 1946. (There had only been a limited opening of capital to employees between 1973 and 1982.)

21st Century

In November 2002, the government conducted an auction for its residual ten-percent stake, which was won by BNP Paribas, but Crédit Agricole subsequently launched a successful friendly takeover bid and took full ownership of Crédit Lyonnais in July 2003.

Crédit Agricole merged its own investment banking arm, Banque Indosuez, with Crédit Lyonnais’s and renamed the merged entity Calyon (for Crédit Agricole Lyonnais) in 2004, but that brand was changed in 2010 to Crédit Agricole CIB (for Commercial and Investment Bank), reflecting the gradual phasing out of the Crédit Lyonnais identity. Also in 2010, the bank’s staff eventually moved out of the historic headquarters on boulevard des Italiens to relocate in the Parisian suburb of Villejuif. Meanwhile, in 2005, the Crédit Lyonnais brand, perceived as tainted by the 1990s turmoil, had been replaced in the French retail network with the blander LCL (introduced as “Crédit Lyonnais, just more dynamic and better performing”), and the number of LCL branches was gradually decreased in subsequent years.

Gallery

Leadership and personnel

 Henri Germain, Chairman 1863-1905
 , Chairman 1905-1907
 , Chairman 1907-1922
 , Chairman 1922-1945
 , Chairman 1946
 Louis Escallier, Chairman 1946-1949
 , Chairman 1949-1955
 , Chairman 1955-1961
 , Chairman 1961-1967
 , Chairman 1967-1974
 , Chairman 1974-1976
 , Chairman 1976-1982
 , Chairman 1982-1986
 , Chairman 1986-1989
 , Chairman 1989-1993
 Jean Peyrelevade, Chairman 1993-2003
 , Chairman 2003-2005
Pascal Lamy was Crédit Lyonnais's Chief Executive from 1994 to 1999.

Other notable former employees of Crédit Lyonnais include occultist Jean Bricaud (1881-1934), union leader Christiane Gilles (1930-2016), politician Henri Guaino (1957-), union leader Gérard Labrune (1943-), scholar Frédéric Lachèvre (1855-1943), politician Arlette Laguiller (1940-), politician Roger Laroque (1910-1985), singer Eddy Mitchell (1942-), family heir Charles Napoléon (1950-), monarchist activist Pierre Pujo (1929-2007), and statesman Lionel Stoléru (1937-2016).

See also 

 Comptoir National d'Escompte de Paris
 Société Générale
 Banque Nationale pour le Commerce et l'Industrie

References

Further reading
 Gale Directory of Company Histories, "Crédit Lyonnais" (2012)  online

External links

Crédit Lyonnais bank profile with list of branches ATMs locations, contacts details and agencies SWIFT codes
 
 

Banks established in 1863
Banks disestablished in 2003
Crédit Agricole subsidiaries
Defunct banks of France
Companies formerly listed on the Tokyo Stock Exchange
Privatized companies of France
Economy of Lyon
Mass media companies